Woolworths.co.uk was an online retail website owned by Shop Direct Group, formed in 2009 after Shop Direct bought the rights to the name and website address of the defunct high street retailer Woolworths. The online store opened on 25 June 2009, but it closed in June 2015, after six years, to be replaced by Shop Direct's existing brand Very.

History

Stores in Britain 

Woolworths started out in the United Kingdom in 1909 as F.W Woolworth & Co, part of the American company that was established in 1879.  The first store was on Church Street in Liverpool and sold children's clothing, stationery and toys from the very beginning. Woolworths took off in the mid-1920s with stores opening as often as every two to three weeks. By 2008 there were 807 Woolworths stores.

Woolworths return as an online retailer 
In November 2008 Woolworths Group entered administration with Deloitte, and by early January 2009 all of its stores had closed. Woolworths' financial performance had been declining in the previous few years, and the events of the closure coincided with the financial crisis and recession which was occurring at the time.

On 2 February 2009, a month after the last Woolworths stores closed, it was announced that the Woolworths brand in the UK, as well as the Ladybird clothing brand had been bought by Shop Direct Group, who are the owners of companies such as Littlewoods, Kays and Great Universal. The Times estimated that they would have paid between £5 million and £10 million for the brand. Shop Direct Group announced their intention to restart the Woolworths brand as an online retailer by the summer of 2009. The website used the same URL as Woolworths had used under the Woolworths Group. Woolworths also launched an Easter egg website, called Woolies Wonderland, for Easter 2009.

On 25 June 2009, woolworths.co.uk reopened with in excess of half a million products on offer.

Ladybird 

Ladybird is a brand of clothing for children aged 0–13 years, which was formerly sold by the Shop Direct Group on the Woolworths website. On 1 February 2009, Shop Direct purchased the Ladybird brand and whole rights from the administrators of Woolworths Group. The brand has a history which dates back to a trading partnership beginning in 1934 between the original firm Adolf Pasold & Son and Woolworths.

References

External links 
 (Redirects to the Very site)
Woolies Wonderland (Defunct)

Retail companies established in 2009
Internet properties established in 2009
British companies established in 2009
Online retailers of the United Kingdom
2009 establishments in the United Kingdom
David and Frederick Barclay